Nivison is a surname. Notable people with the surname include:

David S. Nivison (1923–2014), sinologist in the United States
Jack Nivison (1910–2003), President of the Legislative Council of the Isle of Man
Robert Nivison, 1st Baron Glendyne (1849–1930), Scottish stockbroker
Josephine Hopper, née Nivison (1883–1968), American painter, wife of Edward Hopper